Ja‘far ibn Sa‘īd ibn Sa‘d (d. 1764/1765) was a sharif of the Zayd clan who served as Sharif and Emir of Mecca in August–September 1759.

In May 1759 Çeteci Abdullah Pasha, Vali of Damascus and Emir of the Syrian Hajj, acquired an imperial firman authorizing him to depose Sharif Musa'id ibn Sa'id and replace him with his brother Ja'far, which he accomplished after the completion of the Hajj rituals in Dhu al-Hijjah 1172 AH (August 1759). After the departure of Çeteci Abdullah and the Hajj caravan from Mecca, Ja'far reached an agreement with Musa'id allowing him to return to the throne. He abdicated on 14 Muharram 1173. He later moved to Ta'if, where he busied himself in buying and selling orchards and gardens. He remained on good terms with his brother until his death in 1178 AH (1764/1765).

Notes

References

1760s deaths
Year of birth missing
Dhawu Zayd
18th-century Arabs